Edwin Neal (born July 12, 1945) is an American actor and voice actor, perhaps best known for his role as the hitchhiker in The Texas Chain Saw Massacre. He has been a voice talent and actor for years appearing on screen and off, including three voices in Wii's Metroid Prime 3: Corruption. He set a record doing 26 different voices in the only completely unedited version of all 103 episodes of Gatchaman (Battle of the Planets), which included the lead villain Berg Katse. Neal also provides three voices in the DC Universe Online game; those of Two-Face, Killer Croc, and Harvey Bullock.

Early life and career
Neal, after high school, studied at Lon Morris College in Jacksonville, Texas, before moving on to acting and directing studies at the University of Texas at Austin. While there, Neal auditioned for the role of the Hitchhiker in The Texas Chain Saw Massacre, and got it. He has said that when auditioning he acted as an eccentric relative of his. The movie went on to become a cult classic.

Neal still continues to act. His most notable roles since The Texas Chain Saw Massacre were playing the Mercer interrogator in Oliver Stone's JFK, and Big Chuck's Henchman in the 1993 movie My Boyfriend's Back.  He has also done some voice work, for films, computer games and cartoons. Neal also annually tours worldwide making many public appearances as "The Hitchhiker" at horror conventions and related gatherings.

Honors 
Neal was inducted into the "Hollywood Horror Hall of Fame" in 1993 alongside Vincent Price, and owns one of the world's largest movie poster collections, from 1900 to the present day. He received a Bronze Star for Valor during his service in Vietnam in 1969.

Filmography

Film roles

 The Texas Chain Saw Massacre (1974) - Nubbins Sawyer / The Hitchhiker
 My Two Loves (1986) - Telephone Man
 Future-Kill (1985) - Splatter
 Good Girl, Bad Girl - Nolan
 JFK (1991) - Mercer
 My Boyfriend's Back (1993) - Big Chuck's Henchman
 Mr Hell (2001) - Freemont
 Holy Hell (2005) - Bolton
 Satan's Playground (2006) - Boy
 Shudder - Frances
 Dropping Evil - President Strode
 Bone Boys - Freddy
 The Best Laid Plans (2019) - Jimmy

Anime roles

Blade of the Phantom Master
Final Fantasy: Unlimited - Pist Shaz
Gatchaman - Berg Katse (ADV dub)
Gatchaman: The Movie - Berg Katse (BTVA Award for Best male supporting vocal performance in an anime movie/special.)
GetBackers - Mr. Sasakida
Getter Robo Armageddon - Gai
Happy Lesson - Tanuki
Jing: King of Bandits - Emcee
Lost Universe - Drunk, Barker, Superintendent General, Roy Glen
Mazinger - Professor Morimori, Nuke
Moeyo Ken TV - Nekomaru
Nadia: The Secret of Blue Water || Jean's Uncle, Newspaper Editor
Ninja Resurrection - Souiken Mori
Sakura Wars - Financier, Gojii
Sonic the Hedgehog: The Movie - Dr. Robotnik, President, Metal Robotnik
Soul Hunter - Lisei
Steam Detectives - Dr. Guilty
Wedding Peach - Jamapon
Zaion: I Wish You Were Here - Dr. Domeki

Video game roles

Voice roles
 Love Lost in a Boat - Narration

References

External links

Living people
Male actors from Texas
Lon Morris College alumni
American male film actors
American male television actors
American male voice actors
American military personnel of the Vietnam War
1945 births